William V of Holland may refer to:

 William I, Duke of Bavaria (1330–1389), son of the emperor Louis IV, Holy Roman Emperor and his second wife Margaret of Holland
 William V, Prince of Orange (1748–1806), son of William IV and Anne, Princess Royal and Princess of Orange

See also
William V (disambiguation)